The 2011–12 Oklahoma City Thunder season was the 4th season of the franchise's existence in Oklahoma City as a member of the National Basketball Association (NBA).

The Thunder continued to build on recent success in previous years by making the NBA Playoffs, first defeating and sweeping the defending NBA champions, the Dallas Mavericks, in four games in the First Round, then defeated the Los Angeles Lakers in five games in the Semi-finals, and finally, defeated the San Antonio Spurs in six games in the Western Conference Finals to advance to the NBA Finals for the first time since 1996, when the club was based in Seattle.

In the NBA Finals, the Thunder faced off against the Big Three-led Miami Heat, who made an appearance in the previous NBA Finals, but lost to the Dallas Mavericks in six games. Despite winning Game 1 in the NBA Finals, the Thunder would then go on to lose the next four games and the NBA Finals against the Heat.

Other season highlights included forward Kevin Durant's third consecutive NBA scoring title, and Durant being named the MVP of the All-Star Game. Following the season, James Harden was traded to the Houston Rockets.

Offseason

Draft picks

The Thunder had only their own first-round pick entering the draft. The Thunder traded their 2011 second-round pick in the Latavious Williams trade with the Miami Heat back in 2010. The Thunder ended 2011 NBA Draft night with Boston College guard Reggie Jackson.

Trades
On December 13, the Thunder traded Robert Vaden, a 2012 second-round pick and a 2013 second-round pick to the Minnesota Timberwolves in exchange for Lazar Hayward. Presti said on Hayward that his "toughness, length, and shooting are attributes that will add depth to our roster."

On December 19, the Thunder traded Byron Mullens to the Charlotte Bobcats in exchange for a 2013 second-round pick. Mullens only played in 26 games over two seasons being stuck behind Kendrick Perkins, Nazr Mohammed and Cole Aldrich.

Free agency

For this offseason, free agency began on December 9, 2011, due to the 2011 NBA lockout. Daequan Cook was set to hit restricted free agency. On December 9, Cook agreed to a two-year, $6.5 million deal to re-sign with the Thunder. On December 13, Ryan Reid signed a deal with the Thunder. Reid was originally selected 57th overall in the 2010 NBA Draft but did not a sign a contract in the 2010–11 season, instead playing the season with the Tulsa 66ers.

On December 24, the Thunder waived Nate Robinson. Robinson opted to stay in his hometown Seattle after spending most of his Thunder tenure on the bench.

Roster

Standings

Conference

Division

Game log

Preseason

|- bgcolor="#ccffcc"
| 1
| December 18
| @ Dallas
| 106–92
| Kevin Durant (21)
| Kendrick Perkins (8)
| Russell Westbrook (4)
| American Airlines Center
| 1–0
|- bgcolor="#ccffcc"
| 2
| December 20
| Dallas
| 87–83
| James Harden (13)
| Kendrick PerkinsJames Harden (8)
| James Harden (5)
| Chesapeake Energy Arena
| 2–0

Regular season

|- bgcolor="#ccffcc"
| 1
| December 25
| Orlando
| 
| Kevin Durant (30)
| Russell WestbrookNazr Mohammed (7)
| Kevin DurantRussell Westbrook (6)
| Chesapeake Energy Arena18,203
| 1–0
|- bgcolor="#ccffcc"
| 2
| December 26
| @ Minnesota
| 
| Kevin Durant (33)
| Kendrick Perkins (8)
| Russell Westbrook (6)
| Target Center19,406
| 2–0
|- bgcolor="#ccffcc"
| 3
| December 28
| @ Memphis
| 
| Kevin Durant (32)
| Kevin Durant (8)
| Russell Westbrook (6)
| FedExForum18,119
| 3–0
|- bgcolor="#ccffcc"
| 4
| December 29
| Dallas
| 
| Kevin Durant (30)
| Kevin Durant (11)
| Kevin Durant (6)
| Chesapeake Energy Arena18,203
| 4–0
|- bgcolor="#ccffcc"
| 5
| December 31
| Phoenix
| 
| Russell Westbrook (18)
| Kendrick Perkins (8)
| James Harden (8)
| Chesapeake Energy Arena18,203
| 5–0

|- bgcolor="#ffcccc"
| 6
| January 2
| @ Dallas
| 
| Kevin Durant (27)
| Serge IbakaRussell Westbrook (8)
| Russell WestbrookJames Harden (3)
| American Airlines Center20,108
| 5–1
|- bgcolor="#ffcccc"
| 7
| January 3
| Portland
| 
| James Harden (23)
| Nick Collison (6)
| Russell Westbrook (8)
| Chesapeake Energy Arena18,203
| 5–2
|- bgcolor="#ccffcc"
| 8
| January 6
| Houston
| 
| Kevin Durant (26)
| Serge Ibaka (9)
| Russell Westbrook (5)
| Chesapeake Energy Arena18,203
| 6–2
|- bgcolor="#ccffcc"
| 9
| January 7
| @ Houston
| 
| Kevin Durant (27)
| Kendrick Perkins (9)
| Russell Westbrook (6)
| Toyota Center14,327
| 7–2
|- bgcolor="#ccffcc"
| 10
| January 8
| San Antonio
| 
| Kevin Durant (21)
| Nick CollisonKevin Durant (10)
| Kevin Durant (7)
| Chesapeake Energy Arena18,203
| 8–2
|- bgcolor="#ccffcc"
| 11
| January 10
| @ Memphis
| 
| Russell Westbrook (30)
| Kendrick Perkins (13)
| Kevin Durant (5)
| FedExForum13,601
| 9–2
|- bgcolor="#ccffcc"
| 12
| January 11
| @ New Orleans
| 
| Kevin Durant (29)
| Kevin Durant (10)
| Russell Westbrook (7)
| New Orleans Arena13,565
| 10–2
|- bgcolor="#ccffcc"
| 13
| January 14
| New York
| 
| Kevin Durant (28)
| Russell Westbrook (8)
| Russell Westbrook (8)
| Chesapeake Energy Arena18,203
| 11–2
|- bgcolor="#ccffcc"
| 14
| January 16
| @ Boston
| 
| Kevin Durant (28)
| Kevin DurantRussell Westbrook (7)
| Kevin DurantRussell Westbrook (4)
| TD Garden18,624
| 12–2
|- bgcolor="#ffcccc"
| 15
| January 18
| @ Washington
| 
| Russell Westbrook (36)
| Serge Ibaka (10)
| Russell Westbrook (7)
| Verizon Center15,075
| 12–3
|- bgcolor="#ccffcc"
| 16
| January 21
| @ New Jersey
| 
| Russell Westbrook (21)
| Kevin Durant (15)
| Russell Westbrook (6)
| Prudential Center15,201
| 13–3
|- bgcolor="#ccffcc"
| 17
| January 23
| Detroit
| 
| Russell WestbrookJames Harden (24)
| Serge Ibaka (10)
| Russell Westbrook (6)
| Chesapeake Energy Arena18,203
| 14–3
|- bgcolor="#ccffcc"
| 18
| January 25
| New Orleans
| 
| Kevin Durant (25)
| Kevin DurantSerge Ibaka (7)
| James Harden (6)
| Chesapeake Energy Arena18,203
| 15–3
|- bgcolor="#ccffcc"
| 19
| January 27
| @ Golden State
| 
| Kevin Durant (37)
| Kevin Durant (13)
| Russell Westbrook (11)
| Oracle Arena19,596
| 16–3
|- bgcolor="#ffcccc"
| 20
| January 30
| @ L. A. Clippers
| 
| Kevin Durant (36)
| Kevin Durant (13)
| James Harden (5)
| Staples Center19,404
| 16–4

|- bgcolor="#ccffcc"
| 21
| February 1
| @ Dallas
| 
| Russell Westbrook (33)
| Kevin Durant (13)
| James Harden (9)
| American Airlines Center20,316
| 17–4
|- bgcolor="#ccffcc"
| 22
| February 3
| Memphis
| 
| Kevin Durant (36)
| Kevin Durant (10)
| Russell Westbrook (7)
| Chesapeake Energy Arena18,203
| 18–4
|- bgcolor="#ffcccc"
| 23
| February 4
| @ San Antonio
| 
| Kevin Durant (22)
| Kevin Durant (11)
| Russell Westbrook (6)
| AT&T Center18,581
| 18–5
|- bgcolor="#ccffcc"
| 24
| February 6
| @ Portland
| 
| Kevin Durant (33)
| Serge Ibaka (13)
| Russell Westbrook (8)
| Rose Garden20,559
| 19–5
|- bgcolor="#ccffcc"
| 25
| February 7
| @ Golden State
| 
| Kevin Durant (33)
| Kevin Durant (10)
| Kevin DurantRussell WestbrookJames Harden (7)
| Oracle Arena17,971
| 20–5
|- bgcolor="#ffcccc"
| 26
| February 9
| @ Sacramento
| 
| Kevin Durant (27)
| Serge Ibaka (9)
| Kevin DurantRussell WestbrookJames HardenNick Collison (3)
| Power Balance Pavilion17,317
| 20–6
|- bgcolor="#ccffcc"
| 27
| February 10
| @ Utah
| 
| Russell Westbrook (28)
| Serge Ibaka (11)
| Russell Westbrook (3)
| EnergySolutions Arena19,911
| 21–6
|- bgcolor="#ccffcc"
| 28
| February 14
| Utah
| 
| James Harden (22)
| Serge Ibaka (10)
| Reggie Jackson (8)
| Chesapeake Energy Arena18,203
| 22–6
|- bgcolor="#ffcccc"
| 29
| February 15
| @ Houston
| 
| Kevin Durant (33)
| Kevin DurantRussell Westbrook (8)
| Russell WestbrookJames Harden (4)
| Toyota Center18,274
| 22–7
|- bgcolor="#ccffcc"
| 30
| February 17
| Golden State
| 
| James Harden (25)
| Kevin Durant (10)
| Kevin Durant (6)
| Chesapeake Energy Arena18,203
| 23–7
|- bgcolor="#ccffcc"
| 31
| February 19
| Denver
| 
| Kevin Durant (51)
| Serge Ibaka (15)
| Russell Westbrook (9)
| Chesapeake Energy Arena18,203
| 24–7
|- bgcolor="#ccffcc"
| 32
| February 20
| New Orleans
| 
| Kevin DurantRussell Westbrook (31)
| Kendrick Perkins (10)
| Kevin DurantRussell WestbrookReggie Jackson (4)
| Chesapeake Energy Arena18,203
|  25–7
|- bgcolor="#ccffcc"
| 33
| February 22
| Boston
| 
| Russell Westbrook (31)
| Kendrick Perkins (10)
| James Harden (7)
| Chesapeake Energy Arena18,203
| 26–7
|- bgcolor="#ccffcc"
| 34
| February 23
| L. A. Lakers
| 
| Kevin Durant (33)
| Serge Ibaka (13)
| Kevin DurantRussell Westbrook (6)
| Chesapeake Energy Arena18,203
| 27–7
|- align="center"
|colspan="9" bgcolor="#bbcaff"|All-Star Break
|- bgcolor="#ccffcc"
| 35
| February 29
| @ Philadelphia
| 
| Kevin Durant (23)
| Russell Westbrook (13)
| Russell WestbrookJames Harden (4)
| Wells Fargo Center19,746
| 28–7

|- bgcolor="#ccffcc"
| 36
| March 1
| @ Orlando
| 
| Kevin Durant (38)
| Kendrick Perkins (11)
| Russell Westbrook (10)
| Amway Center18,846
| 29–7
|- bgcolor="#ffcccc"
| 37
| March 3
| @ Atlanta
| 
| Kevin Durant (35)
| Kevin Durant (8)
| Russell Westbrook (4)
| Philips Arena18,087
| 29–8
|- bgcolor="#ccffcc"
| 38
| March 5
| Dallas
| 
| Russell Westbrook (24)
| Kendrick Perkins (14)
| James Harden (4)
| Chesapeake Energy Arena18,203
| 30–8
|- bgcolor="#ccffcc"
| 39
| March 7
| Phoenix
| 
| Russell Westbrook (31)
| Serge Ibaka (20)
| Russell Westbrook (10)
| Chesapeake Energy Arena18,203
| 31–8
|- bgcolor="#ffcccc"
| 40
| March 9
| Cleveland
| 
| Kevin Durant (23)
| Kevin Durant (8)
| Kevin Durant (8)
| Chesapeake Energy Arena18,203
| 31–9
|- bgcolor="#ccffcc"
| 41
| March 10
| Charlotte
| 
| James Harden (33)
| Kevin Durant (7)
| Reggie Jackson (7)
| Chesapeake Energy Arena18,203
| 32–9
|- bgcolor="#ffcccc"
| 42
| March 13
| Houston
| 
| Kevin Durant (28)
| Kevin Durant (12)
| James Harden (7)
| Chesapeake Energy Arena18,203
| 32–10
|- bgcolor="#ccffcc"
| 43
| March 15
| @ Denver
| 
| Kevin Durant (24)
| Kevin Durant (8)
| Russell Westbrook (5)
| Pepsi Center18,458
| 33–10
|- bgcolor="#ffcccc"
| 44
| March 16
| San Antonio
| 
| Russell Westbrook (36)
| Serge Ibaka (12)
| Russell Westbrook (6)
| Chesapeake Energy Arena18,203
| 33–11
|- bgcolor="#ccffcc"
| 45
| March 18
| Portland
| 
| Russell Westbrook (28)
| Serge Ibaka (8)
| James Harden (7)
| Chesapeake Energy Arena18,203
| 34–11
|- bgcolor="#ffcccc"
| 46
| March 20
| @ Utah
| 
| Russell Westbrook (23)
| Serge Ibaka (10)
| Russell Westbrook (3)
| EnergySolutions Arena18,138
| 34–12
|- bgcolor="#ccffcc"
| 47
| March 21
| L. A. Clippers
| 
| Kevin Durant (32)
| Kevin Durant (9)
| Kevin DurantJames Harden (5)
| Chesapeake Energy Arena18,203
| 35–12
|- bgcolor="#ccffcc"
| 48
| March 23
| Minnesota
| 
| Russell Westbrook (45)
| Kevin Durant (17)
| James HardenRussell Westbrook (6)
| Chesapeake Energy Arena18,203
| 36–12
|- bgcolor="#ccffcc"
| 49
| March 25
| Miami
| 
| Kevin Durant (28)
| Serge Ibaka (10)
| Kevin Durant (8)
| Chesapeake Energy Arena18,203
| 37–12
|- bgcolor="#ccffcc"
| 50
| March 27
| @ Portland
| 
| Russell Westbrook (32)
| Serge Ibaka (12)
| Russell Westbrook (8)
| Rose Garden20,626
| 38–12
|- bgcolor="#ccffcc"
| 51
| March 29
| @ L. A. Lakers
| 
| Russell Westbrook (36)
| Kevin Durant (11)
| Russell Westbrook (6)
| Staples Center18,997
| 39–12

|- bgcolor="#ccffcc"
| 52
| April 1
| Chicago
| 
| Russell Westbrook (27)
| Kevin Durant (10)
| Russell Westbrook  (5)
| Chesapeake Energy Arena18,203
| 40–12
|- bgcolor="#ffcccc"
| 53
| April 2
| Memphis
| 
| Kevin Durant (21)
| Kendrick Perkins (11)
| James Harden (5)
| Chesapeake Energy Arena18,203
| 40–13
|- bgcolor="#ffcccc"
| 54
| April 4
| @ Miami
| 
| Kevin Durant (30)
| Serge IbakaKendrick PerkinsNick Collison (7)
| James Harden (5)
| American Airlines Arena20,104
| 40–14
|- bgcolor="#ffcccc"
| 55
| April 6
| @ Indiana
| 
| Kevin Durant (44)
| Russell Westbrook  (11)
| Russell Westbrook  (9)
| Bankers Life Fieldhouse18,165
| 40–15
|- bgcolor="#ccffcc"
| 56
| April 8
| Toronto
| 
| Kevin Durant (23)
| Nick Collison (9)
| Russell Westbrook  (6)
| Chesapeake Energy Arena18,203
| 41–15
|- bgcolor="#ccffcc"
| 57
| April 9
| @ Milwaukee
| 
| Russell Westbrook  (26)
| Kendrick PerkinsRussell WestbrookNick Collison (7)
| Kevin Durant (8)
| Bradley Center14,111
| 42–15
|- bgcolor="#ffcccc"
| 58
| April 11
| L. A. Clippers
| 
| Kevin Durant (22)
| Kevin Durant (9)
| Russell Westbrook  (7)
| Chesapeake Energy Arena18,203
| 42–16
|- bgcolor="#ccffcc"
| 59
| April 13
| Sacramento
| 
| Kevin Durant (29)
| Kendrick Perkins (11)
| Russell Westbrook  (5)
| Chesapeake Energy Arena18,203
| 43–16
|- bgcolor="#ccffcc"
| 60
| April 14
| @ Minnesota
| 
| Kevin Durant (43)
| Serge Ibaka (12)
| Russell Westbrook  (8)
| Target Center19,552
| 44–16
|- bgcolor="#ffcccc"
| 61
| April 16
| @ L. A. Clippers
| 
| Kevin Durant (24)
| Kendrick Perkins (9)
| James HardenRussell Westbrook (3)
| Staples Center19,516
| 44–17
|- bgcolor="#ccffcc"
| 62
| April 18
| @ Phoenix
| 
| James Harden (40)
| Kevin Durant (11)
| | Kevin DurantRussell Westbrook (5)
| US Airways Center14,873
| 45–17
|- bgcolor="#ccffcc"
| 63
| April 20
| @ Sacramento
| 
| Kevin Durant (29)
| Kevin Durant (14)
| Kevin Durant (7)
| Power Balance Pavilion16,882
| 46–17
|- bgcolor="#ffcccc"
| 64
| April 22
| @ L. A. Lakers
| 
| Kevin Durant (35)
| Serge Ibaka (14)
| Russell Westbrook (10)
| Staples Center18,997
| 46–18
|- bgcolor="#ccffcc"
| 65
| April 24
| Sacramento
| 
| Kevin Durant (32)
| Kevin Durant (9)
| Russell Westbrook (6)
| Chesapeake Energy Arena18,203
| 47–18
|- bgcolor="#ffcccc"
| 66
| April 25
| Denver
| 
| Kevin Durant (32)
| Kendrick PerkinsRussell Westbrook (6)
| Russell Westbrook (9)
| Chesapeake Energy Arena18,203
| 47–19

Playoffs

|- bgcolor=ccffcc
| 1
| April 28
| Dallas
| 
| Russell Westbrook (28)
| Kendrick Perkins (8)
| Russell Westbrook (5)
| Chesapeake Energy Arena18,203
| 1–0
|- bgcolor=ccffcc
| 2
| April 30
| Dallas
| 
| Russell Westbrook (29)
| Kevin Durant (10)
| James Harden (5)
| Chesapeake Energy Arena18,203
| 2–0
|- bgcolor=ccffcc
| 3
| May 3
| @ Dallas
| 
| Kevin Durant (31)
| Serge Ibaka (11)
| Kevin Durant (6)
| American Airlines Center20,640
| 3–0
|- bgcolor=ccffcc
| 4
| May 5
| @ Dallas
| 
| James Harden (29)
| Kevin Durant (11)
| Russell Westbrook (6)
| American Airlines Center20,533
| 4–0

|- bgcolor=ccffcc
| 1
| May 14
| L. A. Lakers
| 
| Russell Westbrook (27)
| Kevin Durant (8)
| Russell Westbrook (9)
| Chesapeake Energy Arena18,203
| 1–0
|- bgcolor=ccffcc
| 2
| May 16
| L. A. Lakers
| 
| Kevin Durant (22)
| Kevin Durant (7)
| Kevin Durant (5)
| Chesapeake Energy Arena18,203
| 2–0
|- bgcolor="#ffcccc"
| 3
| May 18
| @ L. A. Lakers
| 
| Kevin Durant (31)
| Serge Ibaka (11)
| Thabo Sefolosha (4)
| Staples Center18,997
| 2–1
|- bgcolor=ccffcc
| 4
| May 19
| @ L. A. Lakers
| 
| Russell Westbrook (37)
| Kevin Durant (13)
| Russell Westbrook (5)
| Staples Center18,997
| 3–1
|- bgcolor=ccffcc
| 5
| May 21
| L. A. Lakers
| 
| Russell Westbrook (28)
| Kendrick Perkins (11)
| Kevin DurantRussell WestbrookJames Harden (4)
| Chesapeake Energy Arena18,203
| 4–1

|- bgcolor=ffcccc
| 1
| May 27
| @ San Antonio
| 
| Kevin Durant (27)
| Kevin Durant (10)
| Russell Westbrook (5)
| AT&T Center18,581
| 0–1
|- bgcolor=ffcccc
| 2
| May 29
| @ San Antonio
| 
| Kevin Durant (31)
| Serge Ibaka (10)
| Russell Westbrook (8)
| AT&T Center18,581
| 0–2
|- bgcolor=ccffcc
| 3
| May 31
| San Antonio
| 
| Kevin Durant (22)
| Kendrick Perkins (8)
| Russell Westbrook (9)
| Chesapeake Energy Arena18,203
| 1–2
|- bgcolor=ccffcc
| 4
| June 2
| San Antonio
| 
| Kevin Durant (36)
| Kendrick Perkins (9)
| Kevin Durant (8)
| Chesapeake Energy Arena18,203
| 2–2
|- bgcolor=ccffcc
| 5
| June 4
| @ San Antonio
| 
| Kevin Durant (27)
| Kendrick Perkins (10)
| Russell Westbrook (12)
| AT&T Center18,581
| 3–2
|- bgcolor=ccffcc
| 6
| June 6
| San Antonio
| 
| Kevin Durant (34)
| Kevin Durant (14)
| Kevin DurantRussell Westbrook (5)
| Chesapeake Energy Arena18,203
| 4–2

|- bgcolor=ccffcc
| 1
| June 12
| Miami
| 
| Kevin Durant (36)
| Nick Collison (10)
| Russell Westbrook (11)
| Chesapeake Energy Arena18,203
| 1–0
|- bgcolor=ffcccc
| 2
| June 14
| Miami
| 
| Kevin Durant (32)
| Kendrick Perkins (8)
| Russell Westbrook (7)
| Chesapeake Energy Arena18,203
| 1–1
|- bgcolor=ffcccc
| 3
| June 17
| @ Miami
| 
| Kevin Durant (25)
| Kendrick Perkins (12)
| James Harden (6)
| American Airlines Arena20,003
| 1–2
|- bgcolor=ffcccc
| 4
| June 19
| @ Miami
| 
| Russell Westbrook (43)
| James Harden (10)
| Russell Westbrook (5)
| American Airlines Arena20,003
| 1–3
|- bgcolor=ffcccc
| 5
| June 21
| @ Miami
| 
| Kevin Durant (32)
| Kevin Durant (11)
| Russell Westbrook (6)
| American Airlines Arena20,003
| 1–4

Player statistics

Regular season

 Led team in statistic
After all games.
‡ Waived during the season
† Traded during the season
≠ Acquired during the season

Playoffs

 Led team in statistic
After all games.

Individual game highs

Awards and records

Awards

Injuries

Transactions

Overview

Trades

Free agency

Re-signed

Additions

Subtractions

References

Oklahoma City Thunder seasons
Oklahoma City Thunder
Western Conference (NBA) championship seasons
2011 in sports in Oklahoma
2012 in sports in Oklahoma